Lawrence Pileggi (born Lawrence Pillage, March 14, 1962) is the Coraluppi Head and Tanoto Professor of Electrical and Computer Engineering at Carnegie Mellon University. He is a specialist in the automation of integrated circuits, and developing software tools for the optimization of power grids. Pileggi’s research has been cited thousands of times in engineering papers.

Education 
Pileggi received B.S. and M.S. degrees in electrical engineering from the University of Pittsburgh in 1983 and 1984, respectively. He received his Ph.D. in electrical and computer engineering from Carnegie Mellon University (CMU) in 1989. His thesis work was the development of the Asymptotic Waveform Evaluation (AWE) algorithm. The published paper that described this work received the 1991 IEEE Transactions on CAD Paper Award.

Career 
Pileggi worked as an IC design engineer at Westinghouse Research and Development, Pittsburgh, PA, from 1984 to 1986.

After receiving his PhD, Pileggi became an assistant professor of electrical and computer engineering at the University of Texas at Austin in 1989. There he and his students developed the open source software tool, RICE, or Rapid Interconnect Circuits Evaluation. RICE was recognized with a 1993 Semiconductor Research Corporation Invention Award. Most of his early research at UT Austin focused on RICE and various aspects of timing analysis, including the concept of effective capacitance for delay calculation purposes.

In 1996, Pileggi returned to CMU as an associate professor of electrical and computer engineering. While at CMU, Pileggi and his students developed new methods of model order reduction such as the PRIMA algorithm, based on Krylov subspace methods, which further extends model order reduction of circuits. His paper about PRIMA was awarded the 1999 IEEE Donald O. Pederson Best Paper Award.

Based on predictions that lithography for ICs was fast approaching fundamental limits, Pileggi led the development of design methods for regular fabrics that could accommodate the nanoscale patterning for integrated circuits. The MARCO/DARPA Gigascale Research Center honored him with their inaugural Richard A. Newton Industrial Impact Award in 2007 for his regular fabrics work. His regular fabrics research was also the catalyst for launching a startup company, Fabbrix, with five of his former students, which was acquired by PDF Solutions in 2007.

In 2005, Pileggi co-founded Xigmix, a startup that was focused on statistical design methods for analog and mixed-mode circuits. In 2007, Xigmix was acquired by Extreme DA, another startup company founded by Pileggi and former students and colleagues; it focused on the development of new methods for statistical timing analysis of digital circuits and was acquired by Synopsys in 2011.

From 2009 to 2013, Pileggi served as the director of the Center for Circuit and System Solutions (C2S2), one of six national centers for advanced research funded by the Semiconductor Research Corporation’s (SRC) Focus Center Research Program (FCRP).

Pileggi’s more recent research work has been developing a “split circuit” approach to the national electric grid that enables the application of circuit simulation techniques. This work was recognized by a Best Paper Award at the 2017 IEEE Power and Energy Society General Meeting, and it also served as the foundation for the startup company Pearl Street Technologies, which he founded in 2018 with two of his former students.

Honors
Pileggi’s development of model order reduction methods resulted in the IEEE Circuits and Systems Society honoring him with the Mac Van Valkenburg Award in 2010. In 2012, the ACM/IEEE society awarded with the A. Richard Newton Technical Impact Award in Electronic Design Automation.

 IEEE Fellow
IEEE Transactions on CAD Paper Award, 1991
 SRC Technical Excellence, 1991 and 1999
SRC Invention Award, 1993 
IEEE Donald O. Pederson Best Paper Award, 1999
Newton Industrial Impact Award, 2007
 Aristotle Award, 2008
 IEEE Van Valkenburg Award, 2010
 National Academy of Inventors Fellow

Selected publications 
Pileggi’s research has been cited thousands of times in engineering papers.

 Pillage, L. T., & Rohrer, R. A. (1990). Asymptotic waveform evaluation for timing analysis. IEEE Transactions on Computer-Aided Design of Integrated Circuits and Systems, 9(4): 352-366. 
 Odabasioglu, A., Celik, M., & Pileggi, L. T. (2003). PRIMA: Passive reduced-order interconnect macromodeling algorithm. In The Best of ICCAD (pp. 433–450). Springer, Boston, MA. 
 Pillage, L. (1998). Electronic Circuit & System Simulation Methods (SRE). New York: McGraw-Hill, Inc. ISBN 978-0-07-134770-9
 Qian, J., Pullela, S., & Pillage, L. (1994). Modeling the" effective capacitance" for the rc interconnect of cmos gates. IEEE Transactions on Computer-Aided Design of Integrated Circuits and Systems, 13(12): 1526-1535.
 Celik, M., Pileggi, L., & Odabasioglu, A. (2002). IC interconnect analysis. Berlin, Germany: Springer Science & Business Media.
 Pileggi, L., & Schmit, H. (2003). U.S. Patent No. 6,633,182. Washington, DC: U.S. Patent and Trademark Office.
 Pileggi, L. T., Strojwas, A. J., & Lanza, L. L. (2011). U.S. Patent No. 7,906,254. Washington, DC: U.S. Patent and Trademark Office.
 Calhoun, B. H., Cao, Y., Li, X., Mai, K., Pileggi, L. T., Rutenbar, R. A., & Shepard, K. L. (2008). Digital circuit design challenges and opportunities in the era of nanoscale CMOS. Proceedings of the IEEE, 96(2): 343-365.
 Zhan, Y., Strojwas, A. J., Li, X., Pileggi, L. T., Newmark, D., & Sharma, M. (2005, June). Correlation-aware statistical timing analysis with non-gaussian delay distributions. In Proceedings of the 42nd annual Design Automation Conference (pp. 77–82). 
 Ratzlaff, C. L., & Pillage, L. T. (1994). RICE: Rapid interconnect circuit evaluation using AWE. IEEE Transactions on Computer-Aided Design of Integrated Circuits and Systems, 13(6), 763-776.

References 

1962 births
Living people